"Wünsch DIR was" (roughly Make a wish; lit. Wish YOURSELF something) is a song by Die Toten Hosen. It's the second single and the thirteenth track from the album Kauf MICH!.

The intro of the song is sung by the children's choir "Mosquito" from the music school in Meerbusch.

The song is generally about hope for a better world and anticipation of a time, when wishing helps again.

Music video
The video was directed by Hans Neleman. It features scenes on a beach and at a funfair; also various circus freaks are shown.

Track listing
 "Wünsch DIR was" (Meurer/Frege) – 4:15
 "Krieg und Frieden" (War and peace) (Meurer/Frege) − 4:58
 "Im Namen des Herrn" (In the name of the Lord) (Frege/Frege) − 2:08
 "Wahre Liebe" (True love) (Rohde/Frege) - 3:29

Charts

1993 singles
Die Toten Hosen songs
Songs written by Campino (singer)
1993 songs
Virgin Records singles